Asura lydia, the lydia lichen moth is a moth of the family Erebidae. It is found in Queensland, New South Wales, the Australian Capital Territory and Victoria.

The wingspan is about 15 mm. Adults are black and yellow.

References

lydia
Moths described in 1805
Moths of Australia